Lian Ross (born Josephine Hiebel; December 8, 1962) is a German Hi-NRG/Euro disco singer.

Career 
She started her career by recording songs with producer Luis Rodriguez, whom she married later.

She has recorded successful covers such as Sylvester's "Do You Wanna Funk" and Modern Talking's "You're My Heart, You're My Soul." Her original hit songs include, "Say You'll Never", "Fantasy", and "Scratch My Name" among others. A compilation of her hit singles and choice tracks, "The Best of and More" was released in 2005. One of her recent successful hit singles is, "Never Gonna Lose" released on ZYX Records in Germany on December 27, 2005 and her song "Young Hearts Run Free" was released on Blanco y Negro Music in Spain on September 9, 2009.

She also provided vocals to many projects with her husband Luis Rodriguez, including Fun Factory, Creative Connection, Josy, Jobel, and Dana Harris.

Discography

Albums

Singles

Duets, featured performances, collaborations

Singles (under pseudonyms)

Videos 
 1984 – Magic
 1984 – You Light Up My Life
 1985 – Fantasy (Live at )
 1986 – Neverending Love
 1987 – Oh, Won't You Tell Me
 1988 – Say, Say, Say
 1989 – Say, Say, Say (Die Spielbude: Mic Mac)
 1989 – Feel So Good (1st version)
 1989 – Feel So Good (2nd version)
 1990 – My World Is Empty Without You
 1996 – Upside Down
 1996 – Upside Down (Live at DanceHaus)
 1999 – I Wanna Be Your Toy
 2004 – Say You'll Never (Discoteka 80's)
 2004 – Scratch My Name (Discoteka 80's)
 2014 – All We Need Is Love (feat. TQ)
 2015 – You're My Heart, You're My Soul (feat. Big Daddi)
 2015 – Viernes Tarde (Tanny Mas feat. Lian Ross)
 2015 – Dale Duro (Tapo & Raya feat. 2 Eivissa)
 2016 – Allez Allez! Je veux que vous dansez (2 Eivissa feat. El Tapo)
 2016 – Game Of Love (feat. Mode One)

References

External links
 Official Webpage
 SoundCloud

Eurodisco musicians
Hi-NRG musicians
German women pop singers
German session musicians
Living people
Musicians from Hamburg
1962 births
Women in electronic music
German expatriates in Spain